Kulm is a ski flying hill located in Tauplitz/Bad Mitterndorf, Styria, Austria opened in 1950. 

In 2003, The women's world record at 200 metres was set by Daniela Iraschko-Stolz, who remains the only woman in history to have jumped over two hundred and it still stands, with total 8 women WRs set here. 

Furthermore, the men's world record has been set three times at Kulm (1962, 1965 and 1986).

This hill is one of only five of its type in the world, allowing for jumps of more than 240 metres. The current hill record of 244 m (801 ft) was set by Peter Prevc during the 2016 Ski Flying World Championships. 

They hosted the five FIS Ski Flying World Championships here in 1975, 1986, 1996, 2006, and 2016. 

In 2015, the hill was last renovated to a current K200 and HS235, with much longer jumps possible.

History

1948/49: Hill construction 
Construction began in 1948 under leadership Viktor Stüger, president of Salzkammergut Ski Association, completed in 1949 as the largest natural ski jumping hill in the world, designed by Ing. Hans Peyerl.

1950: First unofficial event held 
On 8–12 March 1950, opening International Ski Flying Week competition was held on new built ski flying hill. Hubert Neuper Sr. was honoured to be the first to try new hill. The last two days counted for "Longest Ski Jump" competition won by Rudi Dietrich (103 metres) ahead of Hans Eder (102 m) and third placed shared by Werfener Huber and Fritz Ruepp (both 94 metres). However, International Ski Federation (FIS) did not approve the hill and not even this unofficial competition, as it turned out to be, that hill was very poorly and insufficiently built, by far from the International standards valid back then.

1951: Second unofficial event held 
On 16–18 March 1951, second International Ski Flying Week, an unofficial competition was held in front of total 15,000 people. Summary of total length of four jumps counted into final score. Already on first day, Bradl set new hill record at 115 meters. He was also the winner of the 4 jumps competition with 530 meters in total, in front of the 2nd ranked West German Sepp Hohenleitner (504 meters) and the 3rd ranked Rudi Dietrich (501 meters). Hill was rebuilt with many improvements, but in order to receive approval from the FIS to organize the official International Ski Flying Week, further requirements had to be met. Hill was again re-designed by Ing. Hans Peyerl in cooperation with the ski jumping FIS consultant Ing. Straumann.

In 1952, Salzkammergut Ski Association, governed body responsible for the hill was dissolved, because Ausserland came back to Styria. In this way, it was possible to make this hill a top priority for the Styrian state government, which assigned  the responsibility to the Styrian Ski Association.

1953: Hill officially opened with FIS approval 
On 27 February–1 March 1953, three day competition, 1st official "FIS International Ski Flying Week", finally recognized by FIS due to many upgrades. About 50,000 people visited the event. Josef Bradl won the competition with 449.8 points ahead of Andreas Däscher and Roy Sherwood.

On 10–11 March 1956, two day competition, 2nd official "International Ski Flying Week" was held. Total four jumps counted into official result, two best jumps from each day. Peter Lesser won the event with total 428.5 points ahead of Veikko Heinonen (FIN) and Olaf B. Bjørnstad (NOR).

On 20–22 March 1959, three day competition, 3rd official "International Ski Flying Week" was held, on the last day alone crowd of 30,000 people. Six jumps in total, two best from each day counted into official result. Torbjørn Yggeseth (NOR), founder of FIS World Cup won the event.

1962: Lesser set first world record 
On 1–4 March 1962, three day competition, 4th official "International Ski Flying Week" was held. Already on the first day, at the official training, East German Peter Lesser tied the world record with Jože Šlibar (Oberstdorf 1961), first on this hill, at 141 m (463 ft). His team mate Helmut Recknagel won ahead of two West Germans Wolfgang Happle and Max Bolkart, watched by more than 40,000 people on Sunday, the last day alone.

1965: Lesser set second world record 
On 19–21 March 1965, three day competition, "K.O.P. International Ski Flying Week" was held. First day (Friday) counted as official training, but also as a reserved date, if one of two competition days (Saturday or Sunday) was cancelled, would be calculated into official result. Already on first day, Bjørn Wirkola fell at world record distance at 144 meters (472 ft). On Saturday, Peter Lesser also fell at world record distance at 147 metres (482 ft). On Sunday, in front of 30,000 people, Peter Lesser set official world record for the second time here after three years at 145.5 metres (477 ft).

1971: Competition blown away 
On 19–21 March 1971, three-day competition, "K.O.P. International Ski Flying Week", which would also be counting for "Europa Cup", was due to strong wind all three days, first and only time in history completely cancelled. Only four trial jumpers managed to perform the last day. Saturday and Sunday results were planned to count into official results, and if one of them was cancelled, Friday results would be counting as a reserve.

1986: Horrible crashes and WR tied 
On 8–9 March 1986, Kulm hosted "9th FIS Ski Flying World Championships" at enlarged and rebuilt with new K185 point, renovation plan inspired by Planica. More than 50,000 people in total visited in all three days. It started great already on official training (Friday), with new hill record at 188 meters (617 ft) set by Austrian Franz Neuländtner. On the last day (Sunday), Masahiro Akimoto, Ulf Findeisen, Øyvind Berg and Grega Peljhan, all four crashed very hard, from high in the air direct to the ground. Four best jumps in total (2 of 3 best jumps each day) counted into final results. For the great final Andreas Felder who became world champion, set the world record at 191 m (627 feet) and equaled it with Matti Nykänen (1985).

1996: World Championships counted also for World Cup 
On 10–11 February 1996, two-day competition "14th FIS Ski Flying World Championships", with each day also counting for FIS World Cup, was held. Total of 130,000 people gathered in all four days. It all started with free training on Thursday, when Jens Weißflog (201 m) became the first who managed to surpass two-hundred-meter mark on this hill and 8th jump over this barrier in history. Andreas Goldberger became world champion in front of home crowd with total four jumps, two from each day counting (183, 183, 194 and 198 m), with final score of total 738.1 points.

Events

Hill record

Men 
Possible HRs, start order in 2R unclear (7.3.1986)  – Bauer (176m), Klauser (175m), Suorsa (172m), Nykänen (170m), Findeisen (169m).

Ladies

Technical data 
Hillsize – HS235
Inrun angle – 35.3°
Inrun length – 117.4 m
Calculation point – K200
Take-off table (height) – 4.75 m
Landing zone angle – 30.5° to 37.5°
Vertical (from top to bottom) – 197 m
Vertical (take-off table to bottom) – 135 m

References

Ski jumping venues in Austria
Ski flying venues
Sports venues in Styria
Liezen District
1950 establishments in Austria
Sports venues completed in 1950